The 1995 MTV Movie Awards were hosted by Jon Lovitz and Courteney Cox.

Performances
TLC — "Waterfalls"
The Ramones — "Best Song from a Movie Medley"
Boyz II Men — "Water Runs Dry"
Blues Traveler — "Run-Around"

Presenters
Val Kilmer — presented Most Desirable Female
Robert Downey, Jr. — presented Best Comedic Performance
Juliette Lewis — presented Breakthrough Performance
Julianne Moore — presented Best Male Performance
Jon Lovitz and Courteney Cox — presented Most Desirable Male
Cindy Crawford and William Baldwin — presented Best On-Screen Duo
Jon Lovitz — introduced The Ramones
Jon Lovitz and Courteney Cox — Best Song from a Movie
Ice-T — presented Best Action Sequence
Quentin Tarantino — presented Lifetime Achievement Award
Cameron Diaz and Chris Isaak — presented Best Kiss
Eric Stoltz and Alicia Silverstone — presented Best Dance Sequence
Jodie Foster — presented Best New Filmmaker
George Clooney — presented Best Villain
Chazz Palminteri — presented Best Female Performance
Sharon Stone — presented Best Movie

Winners and nominees
Winners are listed first and highlighted in bold.

References

 1995
Mtv Movie Awards
MTV Movie Awards
20th century in Los Angeles
1995 in American cinema